Sonny Graham (born 10 June 2002) is an English professional footballer who plays as a midfielder for Trimpell & Bare Rangers.

Career
On 10 August 2019, Graham made his Bolton Wanderers debut in a 0–0 draw at home to Coventry City, in which Bolton fielded their youngest ever team, due to financial difficulties. He signed his first professional contract with Bolton Wanderers on 15 May 2020, penning a one-year deal. On 19 May 2021 Bolton announced he would be released at the end of his contract.

After being released by Bolton he signed for Mid Lancashire Football League Division One side Trimpell & Bare Rangers.

Career statistics

Notes

References

2002 births
Living people
Sportspeople from Morecambe
English footballers
Association football midfielders
Bolton Wanderers F.C. players
English Football League players